Dunedin Connollys Gaelic Football Club (Irish: Dún Éideann Uí Chonghaile) is a Scottish GAA club based in Edinburgh, Scotland. Founded in 1988, the club takes its name from the Gaelic name for Edinburgh, Dùn Èideann and the surname of Edinburgh-born Irish republican and socialist leader James Connolly. Dunedin Connollys have won the Scottish Championship 16 times and the British GAA title three times, most recently in 2018. Dunedin Connollys currently runs a Senior Men's team, an Intermediate Men's team, a Junior Men's team, two Ladies' teams and an underage set-up, Dunedin Og.

History
Dunedin Connollys was founded in 1988 on Leith Walk, in the north of Edinburgh, at an Irish dancing show.
Father Eamonn Sweeney, the priest who had been instrumental in setting up Gaelic football clubs in the west of Scotland, had a chance meeting with Belfast native Anthony Haughey  and plans for an Edinburgh-based Gaelic team were formed. Initially, the team consisted of first and second generation local Irish immigrants from a working-class background. The club trained on the Meadows, and played home matches at St Augustine's High School, Edinburgh on the western outskirts of the city. The establishment of the British University Gaelic football Championship and university teams at Heriot-Watt University and more recently Napier University and the University of Edinburghprovided the club with a wider playing pool with many of the university team players going on to turn out for Connollys. 
The club's first tournament success came in 1993, with victory in the O’Fiach Cup and was closely followed by the club's maiden Scottish Championship triumph the following year.
In 1998, the club began ground-sharing with Portobello RFC at Cavalry Park in Duddingston.

Present day 
In the early 1990s, there were nearly 20 Gaelic football teams competing in central Scotland. In 2018 that number has been reduced to just five, including Connollys. Dún Deagh Dálriada, Glasgow Gaels GFC (formed in 1999 from the amalgamation of Glencovitt Rovers and Paisley Gaels), Sands MacSwineys GFC (formed by members of the Glasgow-based Pearse Harps who wanted to set up a team in Coatbridge) and Tir Conaill Harps (also established after an ‘amicable’ break away from Pearse Harps by the club's underage section) make up the other four teams. Dunedin Connollys currently has members from Mayo, Kerry, Carlow, Kildare, Tyrone, Leitrim, Sligo, Laois, Donegal, Tipperary, Derry, Armagh, and Roscommon.

British success
After losses to St Peter's Manchester GAA in 2004 and Harlsden Harps in 2005, Dunedin Connollys won their maiden British Championship in 2009, beating holders John Mitchel's of Liverpool by a score of 1–08 to 2-04.
The club then won three consecutive British titles, defeating John Mitchel's after extra time in 2016, defeating Birmingham side Sean McDermotts of Warwickshire GAA in 2017, and Neasden Gaels in 2018.

All-Ireland Junior Club Football Championship
Dunedin Connollys has competed in the All-Ireland Junior Club Football Championship on four occasions, in 2010, 2016/17, 2017/18, and 2018/19.
Connollys lost in the 2010 quarter-final to Emyvale of Monaghan GAA, going down 3–07 to 0-08. In early December 2016, Connollys defeated Laois side Rosenallis GAA 1–09 to 1–06 in Edinburgh  before being knocked out by Ulster GAA champions Rock St Patrick's GAC in January 2017, losing 2–06 to 1–18 at the Athletic Grounds in Armagh.
In December 2017, Connollys hosted first time Ulster champions Naomh Colmcille, with the Donegal side winning 1–10 to 2–06 in Edinburgh.

Dunedin Connollys Ladies
In 1998 a Ladies team was set-up by then club chairman Peter Dillon and his wife Suzanne. To begin with, Connollys Ladies competed in the Ladies University Championship and won it three years on the trot. The Ladies also won back-to-back sevens titles in 2006 and 2007. Since 2009 the ladies' team has competed in the Scottish Ladies university league and Championship.

Dunedin Connollys Juniors
As well as a Men's Senior team, Dunedin Connollys runs a Junior team. The second-string side made it to the 2016 Scottish Junior Championship final, where they were defeated by Glasgow Gaels.

Dunedin Og
Dunedin Connollys has a youth set-up, named Dunedin Og. Founded in 2012, the establishment of Dunedin Og marked the end of two years of hard work and coaching by local Gaelic football enthusiasts in Edinburgh's primary schools. Dunedin Og runs Under-10, Under-12 and Under-14 teams, all of whom compete as mixed gender teams. In 2015, eight Dunedin Og players were called up to the Scottish feile team while one player made the Scotland Under-16 squad.

Honours
Dunedin Connollys have won the Scottish Championship 14 times to date, the first in 1994 and the most recent in 2017. The club won five titles on the trot from 2007 - 2011. Dunedin Connollys have also won the British Championship three times, in 2009, 2016 and 2017.

Current football squad
Bainisteóir: Alan Ward
Roghnóirí:  Ronan Fahy, Robbie Howe

Squad as per Dunedin Connollys v Naomh Colmcille, 2017 All-Ireland Club Junior Football Championship Quarter-Final, 9 December 2017

Notable players
Frank Molloy and Sean Malee are former Mayo GAA panellists  while Conor Horan turned out for the Mayo U21s and Ronan McGurk did likewise for Tyrone GAA minors.
For Dunedin Connollys Ladies, Caoilfhionn Deeney won the All-Ireland title with Wicklow GAA in 2011  while Rosanna Heeney appeared in two All-Ireland finals with Louth GAA in 2010 and 2012.

Honours
Men's Junior All-Ireland Series: semi-finalists - 2016
Men's Junior All-Ireland Series: quarter-finalists - 2010, 20177
Men's British Senior Football Championship: winners 2009, 2016, 2017; finalists 2004, 2005
Men's Scottish Senior Championship: winners - 1994, 2003, 2004, 2005, 2007, 2008, 2009, 2010, 2011, 2013, 2014, 2015, 2016, 2017
Men's Scottish Junior Championship: finalists - 2016
Ladies All-Britain Intermediate Championship: winners 2014, 2015
Ladies All-Britain Junior Championship: winners 2013
Ladies Scottish Senior Championship: winners - 2014, 2015
Ladies Sevens: winners 2006, 2007

References

External links
 Official website
 Laois footballer hoping to help Scottish GAA side to All Ireland glory - Siun Lennon - 14th November 2018

Gaelic football clubs in Scotland
Sports teams in Edinburgh